Igor Nganga (born 14 April 1987) is a Congolese former football player.

N'Ganga had a brief spell in the Swiss Super League with BSC Young Boys.

He attracted media attention in November 2014 as the result of a penalty incident during a game against FC Zürich. Zürich were awarded a penalty which was taken by Amine Chermiti. Goalkeeper Joël Mall saved the initial shot but it rebounded back to Chermiti who shot again, but Mall saved the second shot as well. Chermiti then had a third shot at goal but this time it was acrobatically hooked off the line by N'Ganga.

References

External links
 

1987 births
Footballers from Kinshasa
Living people
Republic of the Congo footballers
Republic of the Congo international footballers
Association football defenders
FC Lausanne-Sport players
BSC Young Boys players
FC Schaffhausen players
FC Chiasso players
FC Aarau players
Swiss Super League players
Swiss Challenge League players
2015 Africa Cup of Nations players
Republic of the Congo expatriate footballers
Expatriate footballers in Switzerland
Republic of the Congo expatriate sportspeople in Switzerland
21st-century Democratic Republic of the Congo people